The Royal Collections Gallery, originally named Royal Collections Museum is an art museum in Madrid yet to be opened. Dependent on Patrimonio Nacional, it is located in a new building in the gardens of the Campo del Moro park next to the Almudena Cathedral and the Royal Palace.

It is intended to house, for public display, paintings, sculptures, tapestries, luxury objects, carriages and other works of art and historical pieces that the different kings of Spain were treasuring throughout history.

In March 2023, the opening was promised for "spring 2023".

History
The origin of the museum dates back to the 1930s, when a first project began in 1935 and the Foundation Decree of the Museum of Arms and Carriages was issued in 1936 by the government of the Second Republic, when the president was Manuel Azaña. The start of the Civil War paralyzed the project, which was resumed, although not materialized, in 1950 and 1980.

National Heritage again raised the idea of building the museum in 1998, reviving the idea of creating a new carriage museum but also exhibiting the works of art, jewelry and tapestries of the dynasties that reigned in Spain in recent centuries, the Habsburgs and the Bourbons.

In 2002, the project presented by the architects Emilio Tuñón and Luis Moreno Mansilla (Mansilla + Tuñón) won the ideas contest for the building, and finally construction started in 2006. The works suffered delays due to the discovery of archaeological remains in the zone, and in addition the central government had to increase considerably the budget destined initially to the work.

The main façade is finished in granite of the  type. This project uses stones of great dimensions that had to be emptied in its interior to cover the structure of reinforced concrete. The placement of these large pieces was a very complex task for which a custom-made tool had to be created, which translated into a laying of the first stone as a decisive act. Also made in the same granite solid steps, rain gutter, large caps and bespoke tops.

The construction of the building was completed in 2016, but because of the caretaker status of the government after the 2016 general election, it could not sign the contract of extra 25 million to finish the interior of the building and the opening was delayed to 2020.

In October 2018, after a year of delays, a temporal union of companies formed by Empty and Telefónica won the public contest to decorate and manage the museum and its collections.

In June 2022, the minister of the Presidency, Félix Bolaños, and the chairwoman of Patrimonio Nacional, Ana de la Cueva, announced that the museum would be open in summer 2023 and renamed as Royal Collections Gallery.

Awards
The building of the museum has received two main awards:
 The Spanish Architecture Award 2017.
 The FAD Awards for Architecture and Interior Design 2017.

See also
 El Prado Museum
 Reina Sofía Museum
 Thyssen-Bornemisza Museum

References

Art museums and galleries in Madrid
Cultural tourism in Spain
Spanish royal collection